Kashi Tamil Sangamam  was a month-long programme organized by the Ministry of Education, Government of India to celebrate,reaffirm and rediscover the age-old links between Tamil Nadu and Varanasi. It was inaugurated by Prime Minister Narendra Modi on November 19,2022 .

Background 
As a part of "Azadi Ka Amrit Mahotsav" to uphold the Spirit of "Ek Bharat Shrestha Bharat", and to expand the relevancy of National Education Policy 2020, a proposal was made before the Ministry of Education, Government of India aiming to rediscover the age-old links of knowledge and civilization between the South Indian state of Tamil Nadu and the Holy City Varanasi (also known as Kashi). The Program was sponsored by IIT Madras in association with Banaras Hindu University.  Ministry of Railways had also announced special trains for Sangamam.

Delegation 
The Event was attended by Chief Minister of Uttar Pradesh Yogi Adityanath and most of the Cabinet Ministers of Government of India including Home Minister Amit Shah, Defence Minister Rajnath Singh,Education Minister Dharmendra Pradhan, Piyush Goyal , Kiren Rijiju and I&B Minister Anurag Thakur . It was also attended by prominent spiritual leaders including Sadguru, Swami Ramdev and Sri Sri Ravishankar.

Controversy 
The Center wrote to Tamil Nadu Chief Minister MK Stalin a month prior to the event seeking his support and participation in the ongoing Kashi Tamil Sangamam but hasn't received a response. The Central government accused Stalin for not supporting the initiative while the DMK leaders accused that the government didn't invited them.

Reception 
The event received a lot of appreciation and compliments from Tamil scholars and was marked as a huge success while the political pundits termed it as a masterstroke of Prime Minister Modi for increasing the focus of Tamil People towards him which could politically benefit him in future.

References 

{{India}}